Events from the year 1876 in France.

Incumbents
President: Patrice de MacMahon, Duke of Magenta 
President of the Council of Ministers: 
 until 23 February: Louis Buffet
 23 February-12 December: Jules Armand Dufaure
 starting 12 December: Jules Simon

Events
 20 February – Legislative Election held.
 5 March – Legislative Election was held.

Births
 3 March – Georges Guillain, neurologist (died 1961)
 4 March – Léon-Paul Fargue, poet and essayist (died 1947)
 5 March – Édouard Belin, photographic inventor (died 1963)
 4 April – Maurice de Vlaminck, painter, printmaker and author (died 1958)
 22 April – Pierre Albert-Birot, author (died 1967)
 29 April – Paul Antoine Aristide Montel, mathematician (died 1975)
 27 May – René Guyon, jurist (died 1963)
 22 June – Madeleine Vionnet, fashion designer (died 1975)
 24 June – Henri Marchal, archaeologist (died 1970)
 12 July – Max Jacob, poet, painter, writer, and critic (died 1944)
 16 October – Gaston Thubé, sailor and Olympic gold medallist (died 1974)
 19 November – Louis de Fleurac, athlete and Olympic medallist (died 1965)

Deaths

January to June
 26 January – Frédérick Lemaître, actor and playwright (born 1800)
 13 February – Gabriel Andral, pathologist (born 1797)
 18 February – Adolphe-Théodore Brongniart, botanist (born 1801)
 5 March – Marie d'Agoult, author, pen name Daniel Stern (born 1805)
 9 March – Louise Colet, poet (born 1810)
 24 May – Alphonse de Cailleux, painter and  arts administrator (born 1788)
 30 April – Antoine Jérôme Balard, chemist and discoverer of bromine (born 1802)
 30 April – Jean-Rémy Bessieux, founder of Roman Catholic mission in Gabon and first Bishop there (born 1803)
 12 May – Louis-Auguste Bisson, photographer (born 1814)
 6 June – Auguste Casimir-Perier, diplomat (born 1811)

July to December
 27 August – Eugène Fromentin, painter and writer (born 1820)
 29 August – Félicien-César David, composer (born 1810)
 August – Etienne-Paulin Gagne, poet, essayist, lawyer, politician, inventor, and eccentric (born 1808)
 10 October – Charles Joseph Sainte-Claire Deville, geologist and meteorologist (born 1814)
 10 October – Hyacinthe de Valroger, Roman Catholic priest and Oratorian (born 1814)

References

1870s in France